Lysine-specific demethylase 4C is an enzyme that in humans is encoded by the KDM4C gene.

Function 

This gene is a member of the Jumonji domain 2 (JMJD2) family and encodes a protein with one JmjC domain, one JmjN domain, two PHD-type zinc fingers, and two Tudor domains. This nuclear protein belongs to the alpha-ketoglutarate-dependent hydroxylase superfamily. It functions as a trimethylation-specific demethylase, converting specific trimethylated histone residues to the dimethylated form. Chromosomal aberrations and increased transcriptional expression of this gene are associated with esophageal squamous cell carcinoma. A expressional decrease of KDM4C was found during cardiac differentation of murine embryonic stem cells.

Model organisms 

Model organisms have been used in the study of KDM4C function. A conditional knockout mouse line, called Kdm4ctm1a(KOMP)Wtsi was generated as part of the International Knockout Mouse Consortium program — a high-throughput mutagenesis project to generate and distribute animal models of disease to interested scientists.

Male and female animals underwent a standardized phenotypic screen to determine the effects of deletion. Twenty five tests were carried out on mutant mice and two significant abnormalities were observed. Homozygous mutant males had decreased haematocrit and haemoglobin levels, while animals of both sex displayed an increase in sebaceous gland size.

References

Further reading 

 
 
 
 
 
 
 

Human 2OG oxygenases
EC 1.14.11
Genes mutated in mice